Emporia is an unincorporated community located in northwest Volusia County, Florida, United States, located along Emporia Road between Pierson and Barberville. The community is primarily agricultural.

References

Unincorporated communities in Volusia County, Florida
Unincorporated communities in Florida